Mörstadt is an Ortsgemeinde – a municipality belonging to a Verbandsgemeinde, a kind of collective municipality – in the Alzey-Worms district in Rhineland-Palatinate, Germany.

Geography

Location 
The municipality lies in Rhenish Hesse and is a winegrowing centre. It belongs to the Verbandsgemeinde of Monsheim, whose seat is in the like-named municipality.

Politics

Municipal council 
The council is made up of 12 council members, who were elected at the municipal election held on 7 June 2009, and the honorary mayor as chairman.

The municipal election held on 7 June 2009 yielded the following results:

Mayors 
 Gerd Ermarth - FWG (1979–1999)
 Horst Wendel - SPD (1999–2019)
 Stephan Hammer - FWG (since 2019)

Coat of arms 
The municipality's arms might be described thus: Azure in chief two mullets Or, in base a daisy argent seeded of the second.

Culture and sightseeing

Buildings 
 Village church from 1670 with a Stumm organ

Theatre 
 Since 2005, Mörstadt has had at its disposal a lakeside stage on the Woog (a local word for “pond”).

Famous people 
 Amalie Haizinger, actress was born here in 1800

Honorary citizens 
 Gerd Ermarth
 Horst Wendel

References

External links 
Municipality’s official webpage 

Alzey-Worms